Acromioplasty is an arthroscopic surgical procedure of the acromion.

Generally, it implies removal of a small piece of the surface of the bone (acromion) that is in contact with a tendon causing, by friction, damage to the tendon.

References

Further reading

External links
 Video of an arthroscopic acromioplasty

Orthopedic surgical procedures